The voiced velar lateral affricate is a type of consonantal sound, used in some spoken languages. This consonant exists in the Laghuu, Hiw and Ekagi languages.

Features
Features of the voiced velar lateral affricate:

Occurrence

See also
 List of phonetic topics

References 

Velar consonants
Lateral consonants
Pulmonic consonants
Voiced oral consonants